Achint Kot or AchintKot is a small village in Amritsar-II in Punjab state of India. Its administrative headquarters are located in Amritsar tehsil. The village has a total number of population 226 houses residing as per 2011 census report if India.

References 

Villages in Amritsar district